Voltaïc refers to five separate releases of related material from musician Björk's seventh studio album Volta. The full version of the release includes a CD of eleven songs performed live at the Olympic Studios, a DVD of Björk's live performances in Paris and Reykjavík during the Volta tour, a second DVD of the Volta music videos as well as videos of the top ten runners-up from the "Innocence" video contest, and a second CD of remixes from Volta'''s singles. The worldwide release date of all editions was 23 June 2009. The artwork was nominated for an award at the 2010 Brit Insurance Design Awards.

 Release history 

The release was subject to numerous delays, mostly due to manufacturing problems. The first mention of the release of live material from the Volta tour was made through an announcement made on Björk's official website regarding a "Live Session Album" made at the now-closed Olympic Studios. This was then followed by online stores adding to their pages a release titled "Volta Revisited" in February 2008, with projected (and incorrect) release dates of April/May 2008 listed. An email from Derek Birkett, head of One Little Indian, stated the proposed contents of the release, meant to 'tie-up' the Volta campaign. The release was originally not going to include a live DVD, but amongst those items that did not make the final release were the online blips made as part of the viral marketing campaign for Volta, the EPK interview that was used in the Volta podcasts available on the iTunes Store, and an unreleased "AOL Online session".

Björk then filmed a concert at L'Olympia in Paris, France during the last leg of the Volta tour and a small concert in Reykjavík, Iceland straight after the tour had finished. The "Volta Revisited" collection eventually surfaced as Voltaïc and was to include a live DVD among 3 other discs, although manufacturing problems lead to a delay of up to six months for its release. One manufacturing error led to 20,000 copies of the box-set having to be destroyed, and with a remanufacture necessary, Björk decided to make changes to the track listing resulting in four songs being cut from the live DVD. Towards the end of April 2009 Universal Europe accidentally shipped their copies of Voltaïc early. A statement released by One Little Indian stated that the projected release date was meant to be June 2009 as they wanted all three versions of Voltaïc to be available upon official release – the early shipment by Universal Europe was only of the Deluxe Edition. However, UK-based music retailer CD Wow was found to be for a brief period selling un-cut copies of the box set, before its official release. These copies, which had allegedly been destroyed, were manufactured in Malaysia – and as such contained more tracks than the other released (cut) editions. Voltaïc eventually enjoyed its full official release on 23 June 2009.

Björk was ill on the night of the Paris concert and later described the recording as being "quite traumatic" as her voice was not in good condition at this late point during the tour.  Because of this, some small parts of Björk's vocals in the Paris concert were edited in post-production, for example in the performance of "Where Is The Line". The Reykjavík concert shows her voice in much better condition. It is notable that both "My Juvenile" and "Pneumonia" were only performed live during the Reykjavík concert – all the other songs were performed throughout the Volta tour.

The originally announced track listing for the Voltaïc Live DVD contained more tracks than those which appear on the final release. "Triumph of a Heart" was cut from the Paris concert, while "Cover Me", "Immature", "It's Oh So Quiet", "Who is It?", "Sonnets/Unrealities XI" and "The Dull Flame of Desire" were cut from the Reykjavík concert. Additional 'cut' songs were performed at each respective concert but were never featured on any track lists for the box-set, e.g. "Oceania". "Brennið Þið Vitar" is the walk-in played by the brass band, and is a traditional Icelandic choral piece.

Theatre screeningsVoltaïc was screened at fifteen theatres throughout the USA to coincide with the North American release on 23 June 2009.

June 17    Boulder, CO    Boulder Theater
June 19, 20    Anchorage, AK    Bear Tooth Theater
June 19–21     Portland, OR    Hollywood Theatre
June 20    Philadelphia, PA    941 Theater
June 23    New York, NY    School of Visual Arts Theater
June 23    Los Angeles, CA    The Montalban Theater
June 23    Madison, WI    The Orpheum Stage Door
June 23–28    Oxford, MS    The Amp
June 23–28    Lake Geneva, WI    Geneva Theater
June 24    Minneapolis, MN    The Trylon Microcinema
June 26, 27    Seattle, WA    Northwest Film Forum
June 26, 27    San Francisco, CA    The Roxie
June 26, 27    Bellingham, WA    Pickford Film Center
June 26, 27    New Orleans, LA    Zeitgeist Arts Center
July 20    Austin, TX    Alamo Drafthouse Ritz

Throughout July 2009 the concert was also shown twice weekly at the Háskólabíó theatre in Reykjavík. Björk herself was present at the first screening.

 Formats Voltaïc'' is released in five different editions: 
CD (the Olympic Studio session)
CD+DVD Deluxe Edition (containing the Volta Tour Live DVD and the Olympic Studio session on CD)
Standard/Limited Edition (containing the Volta Tour Live DVD, Volta Videos DVD, Olympic Studio session CD, and Volta Mixes CD)
Deluxe Vinyl Edition (3 vinyls, 2 CDs and 2 DVDs)

However, only the North American release (on Nonesuch Records) will feature all five different versions – the UK and European releases exclude the CD and CD+DVD editions. Both CDs (Live CD and Remix CD) are also available as digital downloads.

Track listing

Reception

Charts

References

External links
 Voltaïc mini site
 

Björk albums
Björk video albums
2009 compilation albums
One Little Independent Records compilation albums